Dhamapur Dam is an earth-fill dam constructed in 1530 by the villagers and Nagesh Desai who was Mandlik of the Vijaynagar dynasty. The lake behind the dam is one of the biggest lakes of Sindhudurg district in the state of Maharashtra in India. The lake receives water throughout the year and remains full throughout the year.

Specifications
The Dhamapur lake has an area of fifty-five acres, and a maximum depth of 37 1/2 feet. Formed by damming a valley with an earthen bank, though the dam leaks considerably, it holds water in all the year round, and shows no tendency to silt. It waters about 500 acres, forty of them garden and the rest rice land.

History of Forests
The Marathas has large shipbuilding yards at Malvan and Vijaydurg. But while they consumed much fine timber, the rulers thought for the future and took steps to preserve the supply. The only valuable teak reserve now left in the south Konkan, 'Bandh tivara' (Gray mangrove) in the Dapoli sub-division, and the Mhan, Dhamapur and Pendur forest at Malvan were sown by Kanhoji Angre about 1680, and in all their territories his successors stringently enforced forest conservancy
.

Bio-diversity 
Planktons Diversity of Dhamapur lake: This report shows Lentic ecosystem like Dhamapur lake harbour a rich biodiversity of Planktons. Plankton diversity plays a key role in supporting food web aquatic ecosystems. Plankton diversity 10 phytoplankton species (7 species of class Chlorophyceae, 1 species of class Euglenophyceae and 2 species of class Myxophycease) and 7 zooplankton species (4 species of Cladocera, 1 species of group Ostracoda and 2 species of group Rotifera) were recorded.  Season wise highest diversity of both zooplankton and phytoplankton were observed in winter season. As compared to zooplankton, phytoplankton showed mark abundance in Dhamapur Lake.

Check list of Dhamapur Lake plants: Moist deciduous forest present around the Dhamapur Lake is the Reserve forest under the Sawantwadi Forest division. Dr. Balkrishna Gawade, eminent Botanist and Taxonomic along with the Interns of Syamantak "University of Life" lead a forest walk on 10 December 2017, with the aim of listing the plants in and around the Dhamapur Lake. Rare Endangered species like Crotalaria filipes Benth,Gnetum ula Brong and Northopegia colebrookiana (wight) Blume.In addition to this, the plant chlorophytum glaucoides blatter, which is categorized as vulnerable is located on the banks of the lake too.

Purpose
 Irrigation
 Drinking
 fishing

Ancient History of Dhamapur

As mentioned in Kudaldeshkar Samagr Itihas published by Prabodhan Research Associates, 17, KDGB Niwas, Girgaum, Mumbai.400004 - Page no 277 A dam on Dhamapur lake was built in the year 1530. (धामापूर तलावाचा बांध इ.स १५३० मध्ये बांधला आहे. धामापूर गावाचा 'सहम्यपूर' असा उल्लेख बदामी येथील चालुक्य सम्राट विजयादित्य याच्या नेरूर गावच्या शके ६२२ (इ.स.७००) च्या ताम्रपटलिखित दानपत्रात मिळतो तो असा : "विळी (हि?) गे (भे?) नदितटस्थ: बळळावळीळ ग्राम सहम्यपूर ग्रामयोर्मशयस्थ: नेरूर नानाम्नाग्राम: " - नेरुरच्या एका बाजूला नदीकाठी वालावली आणि दुसऱ्या बाजूस नदी पलीकडे धामापूर अशी गांवे आहेत. )

References

Bio-diversity of Dhamapur Lake
1600 establishments in India
Dams completed in 1600